Tatarlı or Tatarly may refer to:
Tatarlı, Goranboy, Azerbaijan
Tatarlı, Shamkir, Azerbaijan